Kamalasagar is an artificial lake in Tripura, India, constructed by King Dhanya Manikya of Tripura in the 15th century and is a popular spot for picnickers. A mela is held there every October during the Navaratri festival.

Politics
Kamalasagar assembly constituency is part of Tripura West (Lok Sabha constituency).

See also 
 Kasbeswari Kali Mata

References

Lakes of Tripura
Reservoirs in India
Water Heritage Sites in India